The Borovniščica is a stream that originates in the hills west of Gorenje Otave and flows to the north through Hell Gorge, creating a series of waterfalls, and then through the village of Borovnica. It then flows across the Ljubljana Marsh, where it joins the Ljubljanica River as a right tributary. The upper course of the creek separates the Rakitna Plateau (to the east) from the Logatec Plateau (to the west).

Name
Borovniščica Creek is named after the village of Borovnica.

See also 
List of rivers of Slovenia

References

External links
Borovniščica Creek on Geopedia 
Hell Gorge near Borovnica at zaplana.net 
Falls in Hell Gorge at burger.si 

Rivers of Inner Carniola